Agrin is a large proteoglycan whose best-characterised role is in the development of the neuromuscular junction during embryogenesis. Agrin is named based on its involvement in the aggregation of acetylcholine receptors during synaptogenesis.  In humans, this protein is encoded by the AGRN gene.

This protein has nine domains homologous to protease inhibitors. It may also have functions in other tissues and during other stages of development.  It is a major proteoglycan component in the glomerular basement membrane and may play a role in the renal filtration and cell-matrix interactions.

Agrin functions by activating the MuSK protein (for Muscle-Specific Kinase),  which is a receptor tyrosine kinase required for the formation and maintenance of the neuromuscular junction. Agrin is required to activate MuSK, which is similarly also required for neuromuscular junction formation.

Discovery

Agrin was first identified by the U.J. McMahan laboratory, Stanford University.

Mechanism of action

During development in humans, the growing end of motor neuron axons secrete a protein called agrin. When secreted, agrin binds to several receptors on the surface of skeletal muscle. The receptor which appears to be required for the formation of the neuromuscular junction (NMJ) is called the MuSK receptor (Muscle specific kinase). MuSK is a receptor tyrosine kinase - meaning that it induces cellular signaling by causing the addition of phosphate molecules to particular tyrosines on itself and on proteins that bind the cytoplasmic domain of the receptor.

In addition to MuSK, agrin binds several other proteins on the surface of muscle, including dystroglycan and laminin.  It is seen that these additional binding steps are required to stabilize the NMJ.

The requirement for Agrin and MuSK in the formation of the NMJ was demonstrated primarily by knockout mouse studies. In mice that are deficient for either protein, the neuromuscular junction does not form. Many other proteins also comprise the NMJ, and are required to maintain its integrity. For example,
MuSK also binds a protein called "dishevelled" (Dvl), which is in the Wnt signalling pathway.  Dvl is additionally required for MuSK-mediated clustering of AChRs, since inhibition of Dvl blocks clustering.

Signaling

The nerve secretes agrin, resulting in phosphorylation of the MuSK receptor.

It seems that the MuSK receptor recruits casein kinase 2, which is required for clustering.

A protein called rapsyn is then recruited to the primary MuSK scaffold, to induce the additional clustering of acetylcholine receptors (AChR). This is thought of as the secondary scaffold.  A protein called Dok-7 has shown to be additionally required for the formation of the secondary scaffold; it is apparently recruited after MuSK phosphorylation and before acetylcholine receptors are clustered.

Structure 
There are three potential heparan sulfate (HS) attachment sites within the primary structure of agrin, but it is thought that only two of these actually carry HS chains when the protein is expressed.

In fact, one study concluded that at least two attachment sites are necessary by inducing synthetic agents.  Since agrin fragments induce acetylcholine receptor aggregation as well as phosphorylation of the MuSK receptor, researchers spliced them and found that the variant did not trigger phosphorylation. It has also been shown that the G3 domain of agrin is very plastic, meaning it can discriminate between binding partners for a better fit.

Heparan sulfate glycosaminoglycans covalently linked to the agrin protein have been shown to play a role in the clustering of AChR. Interference in the correct formation of heparan sulfate through the addition of chlorate to skeletal muscle cell culture results in a decrease in the frequency of spontaneous acetylcholine receptor (AChR) clustering. It may be that rather than solely binding directly to the agrin protein core a number of components of the secondary scaffold may also interact with its heparan sulfate side-chains.

A role in the retention of anionic macromolecules within the vasculature has also been suggested for agrin-linked HS at the glomerular or alveolar basement membrane.

Functions 
Agrin may play an important role in the basement membrane of the microvasculature as well as in synaptic plasticity. Also, agrin may be involved in blood–brain barrier (BBB) formation and/or function  and it influences Aβ homeostasis.

Research 
Agrin is investigated in relation with osteoarthritis. In addition, by its ability to activate the Hippo signaling pathway, agrin is emerging as a key proteoglycan  in the tumor microenvironment.

Clinical significance 
AGRN gene mutation leads to congenital myasthenic syndromes and myasthenia gravis.

A recent genome-wide association study (GWAS) has found that genetic variations in AGRN are associated with late-onset sporadic Alzheimer’s disease (LOAD). These genetic variations alter β-amyloid homeostasis contributing to its accumulation and plaque formation.

References

Further reading 

 

 d

External links 
 

Developmental neuroscience
Molecular neuroscience
Extracellular matrix proteins
Proteoglycans